Caleb Graham (born 12 September 2000) is a professional Australian rules footballer playing for the Gold Coast Football Club in the Australian Football League (AFL).

Early life
Graham was born and raised in Cairns, Queensland. He began playing junior football for the North Cairns Tigers at five years of age. Graham later switched to the Cairns Saints and was placed in the Gold Coast Suns' developmental academy as a teenager. At the start of 2016, he relocated with his family to the Gold Coast where he started playing locally for the Palm Beach Currumbin Australian Football Club and attended Palm Beach Currumbin State High School. While at Palm Beach Currumbin he played in back-to-back QAFL senior premierships, including playing on former AFL Premiership forward Barry Hall at 17 years and 10 days of age in the 2017 QAFL Grand Final.

In November 2018, he was drafted by the Gold Coast Football Club with pick 71 in the AFL draft.

AFL career
Graham made his AFL debut at 18 years of age in Round 21 of the 2019 AFL season, which also happened to be QClash18 against the Brisbane Lions.

Statistics
 'Statistics are correct to the end of round 3, 2022

|- style="background-color: #EAEAEA"
! scope="row" style="text-align:center" | 2019
|
| 46 || 3 || 0 || 0 || 18 || 17 || 35 || 11 || 4 || 0 || 0.0 || 0.0 || 6.0 || 5.7 || 11.7 || 3.7 || 1.3 || 0.0
|-
! scope="row" style="text-align:center" | 2020
|
| 46 || 7 || 0 || 0 || 36 || 14 || 50 || 25 || 2 || 0 || 0.0 || 0.0 || 5.1 || 2.0 || 7.1 || 3.6 || 0.3 || 0.0
|- style="background-color: #EAEAEA"
! scope="row" style="text-align:center" | 2021
|
| 46 || 12 || 0 || 1 || 52 || 33 || 85 || 42 || 8 || 82 || 0.0 || 0.1 || 4.3 || 2.8 || 7.1 || 3.5 || 0.7 || 6.8
|-
! scope="row" style="text-align:center" | 2022
|
| 46 || 3 || 0 || 0 || 7 || 7 || 14 || 3 || 1 || 0 || 0.0 || 0.0 || 2.3 || 2.3 || 4.7 || 1.0 || 0.3 || 0.0
|- class="sortbottom"
! colspan=3| Career
! 25
! 0
! 1
! 113
! 71
! 184
! 81
! 15
! 82
! 0.0
! 0.0
! 4.5
! 2.8
! 7.4
! 3.2
! 0.6
! 3.3
|}

References

External links

2000 births
Living people
Gold Coast Football Club players
Australian rules footballers from Queensland
Sportspeople from Cairns